"Ku" is also the  ISO 639-1 Language Code for the Kurdish language.

Ku is a Loloish language cluster of southeastern Yunnan, China.

Varieties
There are three different varieties of Ku. Speakers of each consider themselves to be separate ethnic groups. However, they are officially classified by the Chinese government as ethnic Yi.

Ku (autonym: ku55) is spoken in Bainitang 白泥塘, Shede Township 舍得彝族乡, Qiubei County, Yunnan Province. They are also locally known as the Bo, and continue to build hanging coffins. The Ku of Bainitang claim that their ancestors had migrated from Yibin, Sichuan.
Another variety of Ku (autonym: ku55) in Wujiazhai 五家寨, Shede Township 舍得彝族乡, Qiubei County, Yunnan Province is unintelligible with Ku of Bainitang 白泥塘.
Ku of Shidongmen 石洞门, Xijide Village 西基得村, Zhulin Township 珠琳镇, Guangnan County, Yunnan Province

References

Loloish languages
Languages of Yunnan